The House Transportation Subcommittee on Highways and Transit is a subcommittee within the House Transportation and Infrastructure Committee.

Jurisdiction
The subcommittee oversees highway, transit, and highway safety programs in the United States, as well as policy governing how highway and transit projects are planned, approved, and constructed. Agencies within its jurisdiction are the Federal Highway Administration, the Federal Transit Administration, and the Federal Motor Carrier Safety Administration. It also oversees portions of the Clean Air Act related to vehicle fuel economy, including Corporate Average Fuel Economy standards set by the National Highway Traffic Safety Administration.

Members, 117th Congress

Historical membership rosters

115th Congress

116th Congress

External links
Subcommittee website

References

Transportation Highways
Transport safety organizations
Federal Highway Administration
Transportation government agencies of the United States